Diospyros sandwicensis is a species of flowering tree in the ebony family, Ebenaceae, that is endemic to Hawaii. It belongs to the same genus as both persimmons and ebony. Its common name, lama, also means enlightenment in Hawaiian. Lama and olopua (Nestegis sandwicensis) are dominant species in lowland dry forests on the islands of Maui, Molokai, Kahoolawe, and Lānai.

Uses
The sapwood of lama is very white and forms a wide band inside the trunk.  The heartwood is reddish-brown, fine-textured, straight-grained, and extremely hard.  Native Hawaiians made aukā (upright supports) out of lama wood, which were used in hīnai (basket fish trap) construction. The white sapwood represented enlightenment, and thus had many religious uses.  The pou (posts), aho (thatching sticks) and oa (rafters) of a special building called a hale lau lama were made of the sapwood. A pā lama is a fenced enclosure made from lama sapwood. A block of the sapwood, covered in a yellow kapa and scented with ōlena (Curcuma longa), was placed on the kuahu (altar) inside of a hālau hula (building in which hula was performed). This block represented Laka, goddess of hula.  The pioi (berries) are edible.

Gallery

References

External links

sandwicensis
Endemic flora of Hawaii
Biota of Lanai
Biota of Maui
Biota of Molokai
Trees of Hawaii
Plants described in 1844
Flora without expected TNC conservation status